Tiya Alicia Miles is an American historian. She is a professor of history at Harvard University and Radcliffe Alumnae Professor at the Radcliffe Institute for Advanced Study. She is a public historian, academic historian, and creative writer whose work explores the intersections of African American, Native American and women's histories.  Her research includes African American and Native American interrelated and comparative histories (especially 19th century); Black, Native, and U.S. women's histories; and African American and Native American women's literature. She has been a MacArthur Fellow.

Life 
Miles was born and raised in Cincinnati, Ohio.  She graduated from Harvard University with an A.B. in 1992, from Emory University with an M.A. in 1995, and from the University of Minnesota with a Ph.D. in 2000. She was an assistant professor at the University of California, Berkeley from 2000 to 2002. She was a School for Advanced Research Resident Scholar from 2007 to 2008.

Works

Awards
 2007 Hiett Prize
 2006 Frederick Jackson Turner Award
 2006 Lora Romero Distinguished First Book Award 
 2011 MacArthur Fellowship
 2018 joint winner, Frederick Douglass Prize for The Dawn of Detroit
 2021 National Book Award for Nonfiction for All That She Carried: The Journey of Ashley's Sack, a Black Family Keepsake
 2022 Cundill Prize for All That She Carried
 2022 joint winner, Frederick Douglass Prize for All That She Carried

References

External links
Congratulations to Tiya Miles, 2011 MacArthur Fellow

21st-century American historians
MacArthur Fellows
Living people
University of Michigan faculty
Harvard University alumni
American women historians
Emory University alumni
University of Minnesota alumni
Year of birth missing (living people)
21st-century American women
National Book Award winners